People of Our Times is a Canadian documentary television series which aired on CBC Television from 1974 to 1977.

Premise
Each episode featured a particular noted cultural personality providing a television essay on a particular topic.

Scheduling
This half-hour series was broadcast as follows (times in Eastern):

Episodes
1974
 "3 Cheers for Toronto", a tour of the city according to Robertson Davies (debut, 9 September 1974)
 "The Politics of Experience", R. D. Laing
 "The Vassar Girl, 1933-74", Mary McCarthy recounts America in the context of the Watergate scandal
 "Let Us Be True To One Another", Vivian Rakoff, concerning loneliness
 "Enough of a Terrible Beauty", Conor Cruise O'Brien of Ireland concerning The Troubles
 "Am I My Brother's Keeper?", Jessica Mitford discusses the prison system
 "Stewart Alsop - A Memoir", a posthumous broadcast in which the American journalist discusses his mortality
 "Guardian of Dreams", featuring British singer Mabel Mercer
 "Reflections From The Waterfront", with American author Eric Hoffer
 "The Prospects For Humanity", Arnold Toynbee

1975
 "Coming Home Again", in which Mordecai Richler speaks of his years outside Canada and his desire to move back
 "A Celebration", with Michel Tremblay whose plays initially found few audiences outside Quebec
 "Will There Always Be An England?", with A. J. P. Taylor
 "Perceptions of France", Mavis Gallant
 "The Devil's Decade", concerning the 1930s, hosted by Claud Cockburn
 "Defending The Peaceable Isles", concerning self-government in Scotland with Scottish National Party leader Donald Stewart
 an essay with Jiddu Krishnamurti
 series finale with Arnold Toynbee

References

External links
 

CBC Television original programming
1974 Canadian television series debuts
1975 Canadian television series endings